Vyacheslav Dmitriyevich Churikov (born 9 January 1970 in Voronezh; died in 2014 in Voronezh) was a Russian football player.

References

1970 births
Footballers from Voronezh
2014 deaths
Soviet footballers
Russian footballers
Russian expatriate footballers
Expatriate footballers in Kazakhstan
FC Fakel Voronezh players
Russian Premier League players
FC Metallurg Lipetsk players
Association football midfielders